Dashavatar is a 2008 animated film based on the ten incarnations of Lord Vishnu.

The film is produced by Vimal Shah under the banner of Phoebus Media. It is directed by Bhavik Thakore. Music is by Anand Kurhekar with lyrics by Sandeep Khare. The movie centers on the ten incarnations of Lord Vishnu as seen by two children. Dashavatar was released in cinemas in India on 13 June 2008.

Plot 
The story is focused in two children that are traveling through time to see the Avatars of Lord Vishnu from Narad Muni's point of view.

At the start of the movie, we see criminals attempting to kidnap the two children. After the sister prays to a statue of Lord Krishna, they are saved and Narad Muni appears to them. Then after saying an incantation are taken back in time to see the story of several Avatars of Lord Vishnu.

The Avatars 
1 Matsya the Fish.
2 Kurma the Tortoise.
3 Varaha the Boar.
4 Narasimha the Half man and Half lion.
5 Vamana the Dwarf.
6 Parashurama the Warrior-sage.
7 Rama the Prince.
8 Krishna the Cowherd prince.
9 Buddha the historical Buddha.
10 Kalki the Avatar of the Future.

Cast 
 Tarun khanna/Sachin Khedekar  — Lord Vishnu
 Shreyas Talpade — Narad
 Rupali Ganguly — Apsara
 Vinay Apte — Kans
 Shishir Sharma — Bali Raja
 Ashish Vidyarthi — Hiranakshyapu
 Keneth Desai  — Lord Indra
 Vatsala M Sharma   - Aarti

Soundtrack

The film's music was composed by Anand Kurhekar and Released by T-Series. All Lyrics were Penned by Sandeep Khare.

See also 
List of animated feature films
List of indian animated feature films

References

External links 
 

2008 films
2008 animated films
Indian animated films
Hindu mythological films
2000s Hindi-language films
Films about Gautama Buddha
Animated films based on Ramayana
Animated films based on Mahabharata
Indian children's films
Films about Krishna
Hinduism in popular culture
Films about Hinduism